Gregory Hill may refer to:

Gregory Hill (1941–2000), religious writer, also known as Malaclypse the Younger
Greg Hill (running back) (born 1972), former NFL running back
Greg Hill (cornerback) (born 1961), former American football cornerback
Greg A. Hill (born 1963), BMX racer
Greg A. Hill (artist), Kanyen'kehaka (Mohawk) artist and curator
Greg Hill (cricketer) (born 1972), former English cricketer
Greg Hill (author), American musician and author
Greg Hill (poet), poet and editor
Greg Hill (educator), Australian educator and vice-chancellor of the University of the Sunshine Coast
Greg Hill (politician), former mayor of Redondo Beach, California
Greg Hill, former bassist of groove spot
Greg Hill (radio), host of the Hillman Morning Show on WAAF Boston
Gregory Hill (hill), a hill (or Marilyn) in Ireland